The Sublime Magic Of Catatonia is a compilation of singles and EPs released by the band Catatonia. It combined tracks from the Bleed and Whale singles and the Hooked EP. The first five tracks on this release were later re-recorded for the band's first album, Way Beyond Blue. The Hooked portion of this compilation was again compiled as part of The Crai-EPs 1993/1994  in 1998.

Track listing

Personnel
 Cerys Matthews – vocals
 Mark Roberts – guitar
 Paul Jones – bass
 Dafydd Ieuan – drums
 Clancy Pegg – keyboards (tracks 7-9)

1996 albums
Catatonia (band) compilation albums